Dinamo Yerevan is a sports association from Yerevan, Armenia. It was founded in 1936.

The club teams include:
FC Dinamo Yerevan - Football team
HC Dinamo Yerevan - Hockey team

 
Multi-sport clubs in Armenia
Figure skating clubs
Figure skating in Armenia
1936 establishments in Armenia